David Leonard Edwards (born February 24, 1954) is an American former professional baseball outfielder. He played all or parts of five seasons in  Major League Baseball (MLB), from  until .

Edwards has two siblings who also played in the major leagues, twin brothers Mike and Marshall Edwards.

In 321 games over five seasons, Edwards posted a .238 batting average (152-for-640) with 95 runs, 14 home runs and 73 RBI. He finished his career with a .958 fielding percentage playing at all three outfield positions.

External links
, or Retrosheet, or Pura Pelota (Venezuelan Winter League)

1954 births
Living people
African-American baseball players
American expatriate baseball players in Mexico
Fort Lauderdale Yankees players
Gulf Coast Twins players
Lynchburg Twins players
Major League Baseball outfielders
Minnesota Twins players
Orlando Twins players
Reno Silver Sox players
San Diego Padres players
Baseball players from Los Angeles
Sultanes de Monterrey players
Tacoma Twins players
Tiburones de La Guaira players
American expatriate baseball players in Venezuela
Toledo Mud Hens players
21st-century African-American people
20th-century African-American sportspeople
Jefferson High School (Los Angeles) alumni